British Guiana (now Guyana)  competed at the 1952 Summer Olympics in Helsinki, Finland.

References
Official Olympic Reports

Nations at the 1952 Summer Olympics
1952 Summer Olympics
Sport in British Guiana
1952 in British Guiana